Iais californica is an isopod species in the Janiridae family. The species has a commensal relationship with another isopod, Sphaeroma quoyanum.

References

Asellota
Animals described in 1904